is a Japanese actor and the eldest member of Johnny's Jr., the trainee unit of the well-known talent agency Johnny & Associates. He is perhaps best known for his role in Kindaichi Shounen no Jikenbo and his various activities as a member of Johnny's Jr.

Biography 
Mizuki Sano graduated from Fujinomiya West High School, and Shizuoka University with a degree in law. He has a younger brother, Daiki Sano, who is also an actor. Mizuki Ashiya and Izumi Sano, the two main characters in the manga Hanazakari no Kimitachi e, are named after him.

Work

Mizuki Sano joined Johnny's in 1991. In 1993, he became a member of the short-lived Johnny's unit J-Eleven and also a member of KinKi Jr., a back-up group for KinKi Kids. In 1995, Sano became a first-generation member of Johnny's Sr., along with Masayuki Sakamoto, Hiroshi Nagano, and Yoshihiko Inohara of V6. Until 1996 he was a back-up dancer for Hikaru Genji, V6, SMAP, and KinKi Kids.

Unlike most of his contemporaries in Johnny's, Sano has neither graduated from Junior status nor left the management of Johnny's. He now mainly performs as a stage actor.
 Unnan no Sekai Seifuku Sengen (1994)
 Aji Ichi Monme (TV Asahi, 1995) - Yuusuke
 SALE! (TV Asahi, 1995) - Kouji Kondou
 Kindaichi Shounen no Jikenbo (NTV, 1995–1996) - Makoto Makabe
 V no Honoo (Fuji TV, 1995) - himself
 Hanayome wa 16 sai! (TV Asahi, 1995) - Daisuke Tachibana
 Dareka ga Dareka ni Aishiteru (TBS, March 29, 1996) - Hiroshi Oono
 Gakkou no Kaidan R: "Hitoribocchi no Dousoukai" (Kansai TV, July 20, 1996) - Isao Yoshibashi
 Drama Shounen Suspense Series: Houkenshitsu ni Mita Kyoufu (TV Asahi, 1998) - Kaoru (lead role)
 Keishichou Sousa File: Sakura-sho no Onna-tachi (TV Asahi, July 25, 2007) - Nobuhiro
 Kero Kero Chime (1997) - Makaeru
 Shinrei (1996) - Taka
 Kindaichi Shounen no Jikenbo (1997) - Makoto Makabe
 Shounen-tai Shuen SHOW Geki '92: MASK (May 1992)
 Bishoujo Senshi Sailor Moon (1993) - Mamoru Chiba/Tuxedo Mask
 Hime-chan no Ribbon (1993) - Head of student council
 Haru wo Matsu Ie (1994) - Shouichi Tominoga
 Mizuiro Jidai (1996–1997) - Shikihito Hashimoto
 Harumachi Kusa (January 4-January 25, 1997) - Michitarou
 Hanairo no Ie (1997) - Gennosuke Tokieda
 Waga Machi (December 1997) - George Gibbs
 Yoru no Kobushi (October 9-October 25, 1998) - Kouta
 Hatsumei BOY Kanepan (December 23-January 15, 1998) - Kanepan (lead role)
 Fortinbras (May 8-May 30, 1999) - Fortinbras
 Midare Kami: Yosano Akiko to Kanemoto (October 2-October 28, 1999) - Saburou Tao
 Watashi Datte! (January 3-January 23, 2000) - Daikichi Komatsu
 Kimi wa Ii Hito, Charlie Brown (September 26-March 31, 2001) - Linus van Pelt
 Ude ni Oboeari (December 1-December 25, 2000) - Seinoshin Hiranuma
 Abarenbō Shōgun: Ken Matsudaira's New Year's Special (January 2-January 27, 2001) - Kishuu Motokage
 Koufuku Onrei (September 2-September 26, 2001) - Akimasa Ootaka
 Fuyu no Undoukai (November 2-November 27, 2001) - Kouichi Senkubo
 Yumemiru Onna (February 2-February 17, 2002) - Youichi Tadakoro
 Fortinbras (April 27-May 5, 2002) - Fortinbras
 Yome mo Shuutome mo Mina Yuurei (August 10-August 25, 2002) - Yuu Sakuma
 Tsuma-tachi no Rokumeikan (November 1-November 26, 2002) - Kenchou Suematsu
 Hakaba Naki Shisha (January 29-February 2, 2003) - Furansowa
 Edokko Geisha: Yumeyakko Funtouki (April 10-May 25, 2003) - Taiyou Yamamoto
 Comic Jack (2003) - Asato Teppen (lead role)
 Omoshiroi Machi (August 20-October 11, 2003) - Tooru Makino
 Sora no Kaa-sama (November 2-November 29, 2003) - Shousuke Kameyama
 Love Letter (February 12-March 9, 2004) - Satoshi
 Yome mo Shuutome mo Mina Yuurei (August 4-August 28, 2004) - Yuu Sakuma
 Gekijou no Kami-sama (January 5-February 26, 2005) - Sen'ichi Kondou, Genzaburou Yagyuu
 Gogo no Yuigonjou (May 5-June 28, 2005) - Daigorou Nishioka
 Akai Yuuhi no Saigon Hotel (August 8-September 30, 2005) - Gwen
 Yonjuuni Choume no Kingdom (November 11-November 27, 2005) - Makoto Tashiro, Kouhei Ootaguro
 Love Letter (June 24-July 2, 2006) - Satoshi
  vol. 8 Wonder Box (September 21-September 26, 2006) - Atsushi Shindou
 Gakuraku Home e Irasshai (April 13-April 27, 2007)
 Shakes (October 4-October 21, 2007) - lead role
 Trifle (February 2-February 10, 2008) - lead role
  vol. 10 Samurai Mode (June 11-June 15, 2008) - Ryoumei
 Eve no Subete (September 6-October 4, 2008)
 Onna tachino Chuushingura (May 6–26, 2013)

External links 
 Fanpage; Last updated: 15 Apr 2005

Johnny & Associates
1973 births
Living people
People from Fujinomiya, Shizuoka
Musicians from Shizuoka Prefecture
21st-century Japanese singers
21st-century Japanese male singers